Girl Trouble is a 1942 comedy film made by 20th Century Fox, directed by Harold D. Schuster, and starring Don Ameche and Joan Bennett. It is also known as Between You and Me and Man from Brazil.

Plot

June Delaney belongs to the upper circles of New York City's social life. When she learns that her private money has been impounded by the British government, since most of her investments are made by her father in England before the outbreak of World War II, she is very annoyed. To make the most of what she got and continue living as before she is forced to rent out her upscale apartment. She advertises in a newspaper, and gets a response from a prospective tenant, a Venezuelan playboy and sole heir to an American rubber industry, Pedro Sullivan.

Pedro is going to the United States to secure a bank loan for his father's business, and needs a place to stay during the negotiations. Despite the huge cost of renting the fancy apartment, he cannot resist its beauty and the charms of its owner June.

When Pedro arrives to his new temporary home, June is dressed in an apron, and Pedro mistakes her for a servant. June does not take him out of his misconception, but continues to play along, telling him that Miss Delaney is away traveling. Since June knows nothing of the servant role, Pedro is soon very disappointed with her services. Pedro also meets resistance in the negotiations with the largest tire manufacturer in the United States, Ambrose Murdock Flint, who insists on investing his money in a rubber substitute instead of the real rubber Pedro has to offer. When Pedro talks to the company's New York representative, Mr. Cordoba, the latter misunderstands him and thinks he has been granted the loan by Flint.

June and Pedro go to the same club that night, and June tries to evade Pedro when she discovers him. Her real name is disclosed to Pedro though by an employee, and since June is oblivious of this, she lets Pedro take her to another club, where they start to fall in love with each other.

Mr. Cordoba learns that Pedro never got the loan and chastises him relentlessly. Pedro is ordered back to Venezuela. By one of June's jealous friends, he is led to believe that it was June that told Cordoba about the loan, to sabotage the deal. June on the other hand, is trying to use her charms to convince Flint investing in property she can offer him, to help Pedro get the money. A misunderstanding occurs as Pedro believes June is competing with him for Flint's money. June and Pedro become enemies, but make up at one of June's friends charity events. At the event, June manages to make Pedro and Flint meet again, and with June's help they finally reach an agreement and Pedro gets the loan. June and Pedro become a romantic couple, but Pedro accidentally manages to flatten Flint's car tire with a gun.

Cast
Don Ameche as Don Pedro Sullivan
Joan Bennett as June Delaney
Billie Burke as Mrs. Rowland
Frank Craven as Ambrose Murdock Flint
Alan Dinehart as Charles Barrett
Helene Reynolds as Helen Martin
Fortunio Bonanova as Simon Cordoba
Ted North as George
Doris Merrick as Susan
Dale Evans as Ruth
Roseanne Murray as Pauline
Janis Carter as Virginia
Vivian Blaine as Barbara
Trudy Marshall as Miss Kennedy
Robert Greig as Fields
Joseph Crehan as Kohn
Mantan Moreland as Edwards
Arthur Loft as Burgess
 John Kelly as Mug
Matt McHugh as Driver
George Lessey as Morgan
Edith Evanson as Huida
Eddie Acuff as Taxi Driver
Lee Bennett as Tom
Ruth Cherrington as Large Woman
Frank Coghlan, Jr. as Elevator Boy
Jeff Corey as Mr. Mooney
Mary Currier as Secretary
Arno Frey as Anton
Marjorie Kane as Cashier
Lois Landon as Mrs. Lawson
Forbes Murray as Mr. Lawson
Henry Roquemore as Man
Edwin Stanley as Lehman
Jack Stoney as Mac
Bruce Warren as Jerry
Doodles Weaver as Ticket Taker

External links
Girl Trouble at the TCM Movie Database

References

1942 films
1942 comedy films
20th Century Fox films
American black-and-white films
American comedy films
1940s English-language films
Films directed by Harold D. Schuster
Films set in New York City
1940s American films